Robert A. Daigle (born April 3, 1953) is an American politician from Maine. A Republican, Daigle represented Arundel, Maine in the Maine House of Representatives from 1999 to 2006. Prior to running for office, he served as Chair of Maine's Pollution Prevention Advisory Committee from 1990 to 1996. Born in Portland, Maine, he earned a B.S. from the University of Maine in 1975. He is married and has one child.

References

1953 births
Living people
People from Arundel, Maine
Republican Party members of the Maine House of Representatives
University of Maine alumni